Choča is a village and municipality in Zlaté Moravce District of the Nitra Region, in western-central Slovakia.

History
In historical records the village was first mentioned in 1209.

Geography
The municipality lies at an altitude of 180 metres and covers an area of 4.39 km². It has a population of about 490 people.

Ethnicity
The population is roughly 99% Slovak.

Facilities
The village has a small public library a gym and football pitch.

See also
 List of municipalities and towns in Slovakia

References

Genealogical resources

The records for genealogical research are available at the state archive "Statny Archiv in Nitra, Slovakia"

 Roman Catholic church records (births/marriages/deaths): 1697-1896 (parish B)

External links
Official homepage
Surnames of living people in Choca

Villages and municipalities in Zlaté Moravce District